Azamat Nurbiyevich Gonezhukov (born 13 January 1987) is a former Russian professional football player.

Club career
He played 4 seasons in the Russian Football National League for 4 different clubs.

External links
 
 

1987 births
People from Maykop
Living people
Russian footballers
Association football forwards
FC Dynamo Saint Petersburg players
FC Baltika Kaliningrad players
FC Volgar Astrakhan players
FC Sokol Saratov players
FC Baikal Irkutsk players
FC Tambov players
FC Torpedo Moscow players
Sportspeople from Adygea